Kathryn Diane Meyer (January 20, 2000 – March 1, 2022) was an American soccer player who played as goalkeeper for the Stanford University's women's soccer team.

Early life
Meyer was born in Burbank, California, and grew up in Newbury Park, California, with her parents Steven and Gina Meyer. Meyer was a middle child with older sibling Samantha, and younger sibling Siena. In 2015, she was featured in the Soccer Superstar reality show on Nickelodeon.

High school (2014–2018) 
Meyer attended Newbury Park High School for her first three years of high school before transferring to Century Academy in Thousand Oaks, California for her senior year. During her time at Newbury Park High School, she was also the kicker for the varsity football team for two seasons. In addition to her school team, she played for club teams Real So Cal and Eagles Soccer Club, as well as the U16 girls' national team.

Stanford University
On October 10, 2015, Meyer committed to playing college soccer for the Stanford Cardinal. She began at Stanford University in 2018. She redshirted during her freshman year, and played her first season for the team in 2019. She played a critical role in the 2019 College Cup championship game against the University of North Carolina as Stanford won in a penalty shootout. Meyer was recognized as the MVP of the match and video of her goalkeeping went viral. She was a team captain in the 2020 and 2021 seasons. 

Meyer was pursuing a degree in international relations with a minor in history. She was part of the 2022 cohort for the selective Mayfield Fellows Program which develops Stanford students to lead technology ventures.

Death
Meyer was found dead in her dorm room in Crothers Hall, a residential housing building on the Stanford campus, on March 1, 2022. When asked about the situation surrounding her death, Meyer's mother said that she had received an email about disciplinary action, and that "She had been getting letters for a couple months... This letter was kind of the final letter that there was going to be a trial or some kind of something. This was the only thing we can come up with that triggered something." Dee Mostofi, the Stanford  Assistant Vice President, stated "We [the Stanford University administration] are not able to share information about confidential student disciplinary matters". A statement by Santa Clara County on March 3, 2022, stated that the coroner's office determined the death to be "self-inflicted", with "no indication of foul play". 

The Meyer family filed a wrongful death suit against Stanford on November 23, 2022 in Santa Clara County Superior Court. The suit reported that Meyer had been "facing disciplinary action for allegedly spilling coffee on a Stanford football player who was accused of sexually assaulting a female soccer player. Meyer's father said his daughter was defending that teammate, who was a minor at the time." The complaint was through the Stanford Office of Community Standards and possible sanctions included having her diploma withheld. It was reported that Meyer was hoping to attend Stanford Law School after graduating.

College career statistics

Honors

Stanford Cardinal
 Pac-12 champion: 2019
 NCAA Division I Women's Soccer Championship: 2019

Individual
 College Cup All-Tournament Team: 2019
 United Soccer Coaches All-West-Region: 2019 (third team)
 Pac-12 Academic Honor Roll: 2019, 2020–21
 CoSIDA Academic All-District-8: 2021

References 

2000 births
2022 deaths
2022 suicides
Sportspeople from Burbank, California
People from Newbury Park, California
Soccer players from California
American women's soccer players
Women's association football goalkeepers
Stanford Cardinal women's soccer players
Suicides in California
College students who committed suicide